Chenopodium atrovirens is a species of flowering plant in the amaranth family known by the common names pinyon goosefoot and dark goosefoot.

Distribution
It is native to western North America, including southern Western Canada and most of the Western United States. It grows in many types of habitat, including open, sandy sites and disturbed areas, and in montane regions such as the Sierra Nevada, Peninsular Ranges, and Rocky Mountains.

Description
It is an annual herb growing an erect, branching stem up to about 60 centimeters tall, sometimes remaining much smaller. It is green to magenta in color and coated lightly in pinkish powdery dust. The leaves are oblong or oval and up to 3.5 centimeters long. They have smooth edges and sometimes have a few lobes.

The inflorescence is a rounded cluster of many minute flowers. Each tiny flower has five slightly powdery lobes in its corolla, each barely visible. The fruit is oval in shape and about a millimeter long, coating the tiny seed loosely.

References

External links

Jepson Manual Treatment
USDA Plants Profile
Southwest Colorado Wildflowers

atrovirens
Flora of Western Canada
Flora of the Western United States
Flora of the Southwestern United States
Flora of Colorado
Flora of the Sierra Nevada (United States)
Flora of the Rocky Mountains
Flora of California
Flora of the California desert regions
Flora of North America
Flora without expected TNC conservation status